Sośnicowice  (German: Kieferstädtel) is a town in Gliwice County, Silesian Voivodeship, Poland, with 1,919 inhabitants (2019). It is the capital of Gmina Sośnicowice, which has been officially bilingual in Polish and German since 2013.

Geography 
Sośnicowice is located in Upper Silesia on the Kłodnica and Bierawka rivers on the western edge of the Upper Silesian Industrial Region, about 8 km southwest of the center of Gliwice.

History 
The town was first mentioned in 1305 when it was part of the Duchy of Opole.

In 1526 the town, as part of the Lands of the Bohemian Crown, fell under Habsburg rule. In the same year, Emperor Ferdinand I had the town rebuilt and founded, for which the forest had been cleared by residents who immigrated from Bohemia. Until the 16th century, the town belonged to the Duchy of Opole, after which it passed into the possession of various noble families. Soon afterwards, the Reformation took hold in the city, after which the parish church was taken over by the Protestants in 1555, in whose hands it remained until 1679. With the Counter-Reformation of the Habsburgs, the city was re-Catholicized. The town was devastated during the Thirty Years' War in 1626.

The town became part of the Kingdom of Prussia in 1742, after the First Silesian War. During the Seven Years' War from 1756 to 1763, it was burned to the ground. In January 1871, the town, known in German as Kieferstädtel became part of the German Empire and was located in the Tost-Gleiwitz district in the Prussian Province of Silesia. In the 1921 Upper Silesia plebiscite, 78.3% of the residents of Kieferstädtel voted to remain in Germany. During the Kristallnacht in 1938, the wooden buildings on the small Jewish cemetery southeast of Kieferstädtel were burned down. At that time, however, there were no longer any Jews living in the town.

Towards the end of World War II, the town was captured by the Red Army on January 27, 1945. After the end of the war, the town was part of the region that became part of Poland under the terms of the Potsdam Agreement.

Points of interest

Twin towns – sister cities
See twin towns of Gmina Sośnicowice.

See also
Liber fundationis episcopatus Vratislaviensis endowments of the Bishopric of Wrocław

References

External links
 Official website at Sosnicowice.pl
 Jewish Community in Sośnicowice on Virtual Shtetl

Cities and towns in Silesian Voivodeship
Gliwice County